The history of Sri Lanka is intertwined with the history of the broader Indian subcontinent and the surrounding regions, comprising the areas of South Asia, Southeast Asia and the Indian Ocean. The early human remains found on the island of Sri Lanka date to about 38,000 years ago (Balangoda Man).

The historical period begins roughly in the 3rd century, based on Pali chronicles like the Mahavamsa, Deepavamsa, and the Culavamsa. They describe the history since the arrival of Prince Vijaya from Northern India The earliest documents of settlement in the Island are found in these chronicles. These chronicles cover the period since the establishment of the Kingdom of Tambapanni in the 6th century BCE by the earliest ancestors of the Sinhalese. The first Sri Lankan ruler of the Anuradhapura Kingdom, Pandukabhaya, is recorded for the 4th century BCE. Buddhism was introduced in the 3rd century BCE by Arhath Mahinda (son of the Indian emperor Ashoka).

The island was divided into numerous kingdoms over the following centuries, intermittently (between CE 993–1077) united under Chola rule. Sri Lanka was ruled by 181 monarchs from the Anuradhapura to Kandy periods. From the 16th century, some coastal areas of the country were also controlled by the Portuguese, Dutch and British. Between 1597 and 1658, a substantial part of the island was under Portuguese rule. The Portuguese lost their possessions in Ceylon due to Dutch intervention in the Eighty Years' War. Following the Kandyan Wars, the island was united under British rule in 1815. Armed uprisings against the British took place in 1818 Uva Rebellion and 1848 Matale Rebellion. Independence was finally granted in 1948 but the country remained a Dominion of the British Empire until 1972.

In 1972, Sri Lanka assumed the status of a Republic. A constitution was introduced in 1978 which made the Executive President the head of state. The Sri Lankan Civil War began in 1983, including Insurrections in 1971 and 1987, with the 25-year-long civil war ending in 2009. There was an attempted coup in 1962 against the government under Sirimavo Bandaranaike.

Prehistory

Evidence of human colonization in Sri Lanka appears at the site of Balangoda. Balangoda Man arrived on the island about 125,000 years ago and has been identified as Mesolithic hunter-gatherers who lived in caves. Several of these caves, including the well-known Batadombalena and the Fa Hien Cave, have yielded many artifacts from these people, who are currently the first known inhabitants of the island.

Balangoda Man probably created Horton Plains, in the central hills, by burning the trees in order to catch game. However, the discovery of oats and barley on the plains at about 15,000 BCE suggests that agriculture had already developed at this early date.

Several minute granite tools (about 4 centimetres in length), earthenware, remnants of charred timber, and clay burial pots date to the Mesolithic. Human remains dating to 6000 BCE have been discovered during recent excavations around a cave at Warana Raja Maha Vihara and in the Kalatuwawa area.

Cinnamon is native to Sri Lanka and has been found in Ancient Egypt as early as 1500 BCE, suggesting early trade between Egypt and the island's inhabitants. It is possible that Biblical Tarshish was located on the island. James Emerson Tennent identified Tarshish with Galle.

The protohistoric Early Iron Age appears to have established itself in South India by at least as early as 1200 BCE, if not earlier (Possehl 1990; Deraniyagala 1992:734). The earliest manifestation of this in Sri Lanka is radiocarbon-dated to c. 1000–800 BCE at Anuradhapura and Aligala shelter in Sigiriya (Deraniyagala 1992:709-29; Karunaratne and Adikari 1994:58; Mogren 1994:39; with the Anuradhapura dating corroborated by Coningham 1999). It is very likely that further investigations will push back the Sri Lankan lower boundary to match that of South India.

During the protohistoric period (1000-500 BCE) Sri Lanka was culturally united with southern India., and shared the same megalithic burials, pottery, iron technology, farming techniques and megalithic graffiti. This cultural complex spread from southern India along with Dravidian clans such as the Velir, prior to the migration of Prakrit speakers.

Archaeological evidence for the beginnings of the Iron Age in Sri Lanka is found at Anuradhapura, where a large city–settlement was founded before 900 BCE. The settlement was about 15 hectares in 900 BCE, but by 700 BCE it had expanded to 50 hectares. A similar site from the same period has also been discovered near Aligala in Sigiriya.

The hunter-gatherer people known as the Wanniyala-Aetto or Veddas, who still live in the central, Uva and north-eastern parts of the island, are probably direct descendants of the first inhabitants, Balangoda Man. They may have migrated to the island from the mainland around the time humans spread from Africa to the Indian subcontinent.

Later Indo Aryan migrants developed a unique hydraulic civilization named Sinhala. Their Achievements include the construction of the largest reservoirs and dams of the ancient world as well as enormous pyramid-like stupa (dāgaba in Sinhala) architecture. This phase of Sri Lankan culture may have seen the introduction of early Buddhism.

Early history recorded in Buddhist scriptures refers to three visits by the Buddha to the island to see the Naga Kings, snakes that can take the form of a human at will.

The earliest surviving chronicles from the island, the Dipavamsa and the Mahavamsa, say that Yakkhas, Nagas, Rakkhas and Devas inhabited the island prior to the migration of Indo Aryans.

Pre-Anuradhapura period (543–377 BCE)

Indo-Aryan syncretism 

The Pali chronicles, the Dipavamsa, Mahavamsa, Thupavamsa and the Chulavamsa, as well as a large collection of stone inscriptions, the Indian Epigraphical records, the Burmese versions of the chronicles etc., provide information on the history of Sri Lanka from about the 6th century BCE.

The Mahavamsa, written around 400 CE by the monk Mahanama, using the Deepavamsa, the Attakatha and other written sources available to him, correlates well with Indian histories of the period. Indeed, Emperor Ashoka's reign is recorded in the Mahavamsa. The Mahavamsa account of the period prior to Asoka's coronation, 218 years after the Buddha's death, seems to be part legend. Proper historical records begin with the arrival of Vijaya and his 700 followers from Vanga. A detailed description of the dynastic accounts from Vijaya's time is provided in the Mahavamsa. H. W. Codrington puts it, 'It is possible and even probable that Vijaya ('The Conqueror') himself is a composite character combining in his person...two conquests' of ancient Sri Lanka. Vijaya is an Indian prince, the eldest son of King Sinhabahu ("Man with Lion arms") and his sister Queen Sinhasivali. Both these Sinhalese leaders were born of a mythical union between a lion and a human princess. The Mahavamsa states that Vijaya landed on the same day as the death of the Buddha (See Geiger's preface to Mahavamsa). The story of Vijaya and Kuveni (the local reigning queen) is reminiscent of Greek legend and may have a common source in ancient Proto-Indo-European folk tales.

According to the Mahavamsa, Vijaya landed on Sri Lanka near Mahathitha (Manthota or Mannar), and named on the island of Tambaparni ("copper-colored sand"). This name is attested to in Ptolemy's map of the ancient world. The Mahavamsa also describes the Buddha visiting Sri Lanka three times. Firstly, to stop a war between a Naga king and his son in law who were fighting over a ruby chair. It is said that on his last visit he left his foot mark on Siri Pada ("Adam's Peak").

Tamirabharani is the old name for the second longest river in Sri Lanka (known as Malwatu Oya in Sinhala and Aruvi Aru in Tamil). This river was a main supply route connecting the capital, Anuradhapura, to Mahathitha (now Mannar). The waterway was used by Greek and Chinese ships traveling the southern Silk Route.

Mahathir was an ancient port linking Sri Lanka to India and the Persian Gulf.

The present day Sinhalese are a mixture of the Indo Aryans and the Indigenous The Sinhalese are recognized as a distinct ethnic group from other groups in neighboring south India based on the Indo-Aryan language, culture, Theravada Buddhism, genetics and the physical anthropology.

Anuradhapura period (377 BCE–1017)

In the early ages of the Anuradhapura Kingdom, the economy was based on farming and early settlements were mainly made near the rivers of the east, north central, and north east areas which had the water necessary for farming the whole year round. The king was the ruler of country and responsible for the law, the army, and being the protector of faith. Devanampiya Tissa (250–210 BCE) was Sinhalese and was friends with the King of the Maurya clan. His links with Emperor Asoka led to the introduction of Buddhism by Mahinda (son of Asoka) around 247 BCE. Sangamitta (sister of Mahinda) brought a Bodhi sapling via Jambukola (west of Kankesanthurai). This king's reign was crucial to Theravada Buddhism and for Sri Lanka.

The Mauryan-Sanskrit text Arthashastra referred to the pearls and gems of Sri Lanka. A kind of pearl, kauleya (Sanskrit: कौलेय) was referred in that text and also mentioned it collected from Mayurgrām of Sinhala. Pārsamudra(पारसमुद्र), a gem, was also being collected from Sinhala.

Ellalan (205–161 BCE) was a Tamil King who ruled "Pihiti Rata" (Sri Lanka north of the Mahaweli) after killing King Asela. During Ellalan's time Kelani Tissa was a sub-king of Maya Rata (in the south-west) and Kavan Tissa was a regional sub-king of Ruhuna (in the south-east). Kavan Tissa built Tissa Maha Vihara, Dighavapi Tank and many shrines in Seruvila. Dutugemunu (161–137 BCE), the eldest son of King Kavan Tissa, at 25 years of age defeated the South Indian Tamil invader Elara (over 64 years of age) in single combat, described in the Mahavamsa. The Ruwanwelisaya, built by Dutugemunu, is a dagaba of pyramid-like proportions and was considered an engineering marvel.

Pulahatta (or Pulahatha), the first of the Five Dravidians, was deposed by Bahiya. He in turn was deposed by Panaya Mara who was deposed by Pilaya Mara, murdered by Dathika in 88 BCE. Mara was deposed by Valagamba I (89–77 BCE) which ended Tamil rule. The Mahavihara Theravada Abhayagiri ("pro-Mahayana") doctrinal disputes arose at this time. The Tripitaka was written in Pali at Aluvihara, Matale. Chora Naga (63–51 BCE), a Mahanagan, was poisoned by his consort Anula who became queen. Queen Anula (48–44 BCE), the widow of Chora Naga and of Kuda Tissa, was the first Queen of Lanka. She had many lovers who were poisoned by her and was killed by Kuttakanna Tissa. Vasabha (67–111 CE), named on the Vallipuram gold plate, fortified Anuradhapura and built eleven tanks as well as pronouncing many edicts. Gajabahu I (114–136) invaded the Chola kingdom and brought back captives as well as recovering the relic of the tooth of the Buddha. A Sangam Period classic, Manimekalai, attributes the origin of the first Pallava King from a liaison between the daughter of a Naga king of Manipallava named Pilli Valai (Pilivalai) with a Chola king, Killivalavan, out of which union was born a prince, who was lost in ship wreck and found with a twig (pallava) of Cephalandra Indica (Tondai) around his ankle and hence named Tondai-man. Another version states "Pallava" was born from the union of the Brahmin Ashvatthama with a Naga Princess also supposedly supported in the sixth verse of the Bahur plates which states "From Ashvatthama was born the king named Pallava".

There was intense Roman trade with the ancient Tamil country (present day Southern India) and Sri Lanka, establishing trading settlements which remained long after the fall of the Western Roman Empire.

It was in the first century AD where Saint Thomas the Apostle introduced Sri Lanka's first monotheistic religion, Christianity, according to a local Christian tradition

During the reign of Mahasena (274–301) the Theravada (Maha Vihara) was persecuted and the Mahayanan branch of Buddhism appeared. Later the King returned to the Maha Vihara. Pandu (429) was the first of seven Pandiyan rulers, ending with Pithya in 455. Dhatusena (459–477) "Kalaweva" and his son Kashyapa (477–495) built the famous Sigiriya rock palace where some 700 rock graffiti give a glimpse of ancient Sinhala.

Decline

In 993, when Raja Raja Chola sent a large Chola army which conquered the Anuradhapura Kingdom, in the north, and added it to the sovereignty of the Chola Empire. The whole island was subsequently conquered and incorporated as a province of the vast Chola empire during the reign of his son Rajendra Chola.

Polonnaruwa period (1056–1232)

The Kingdom of Polonnaruwa was the second major Sinhalese kingdom of Sri Lanka. It lasted from 1055 under Vijayabahu I to 1212 under the rule of Lilavati. The Kingdom of Polonnaruwa came into being after the Anuradhapura Kingdom was invaded by Chola forces under Rajaraja I and led to formation of the Kingdom of Ruhuna, where the Sinhalese Kings ruled during Chola occupation.

Decline
Sadayavarman Sundara Pandyan I invaded Sri Lanka in the 13th century and defeated Chandrabanu the usurper of the Jaffna Kingdom in northern Sri Lanka. Sadayavarman Sundara Pandyan I forced Candrabhanu to submit to the Pandyan rule and to pay tributes to the Pandyan Dynasty. But later on when Candrabhanu became powerful enough he again invaded the Singhalese kingdom but he was defeated by the brother of Sadayavarman Sundara Pandyan I called Veera Pandyan I and Candrabhanu died. Sri Lanka was invaded for the 3rd time by the Pandyan Dynasty under the leadership of Arya Cakravarti who established the Jaffna kingdom.

Transitional period (1232–1505)

Jaffna Kingdom
Also known as the Aryacakravarti dynasty, was a northern kingdom centred around the Jaffna Peninsula. 
In 1247, the Malay kingdom of Tambralinga which was a vassal of the Srivijaya Empire led by their king Chandrabhanu briefly invaded Sri Lanka especially the Jaffna Kingdom, from Insular Southeast Asia. They were then expelled by the South Indian Pandyan Dynasty. However, this temporary invasion permanently introduced the presence of various Malayo-Polynesian merchant ethnic groups, from Sumatrans (Indonesia) to Lucoes (Philippines) into Sri Lanka.

Kingdom of Dambadeniya

After defeating Kalinga Magha, King Parakramabahu established his Kingdom in Dambadeniya. He built the Temple of The Sacred Tooth Relic in Dambadeniya.

Kingdom of Gampola

It was established by king Buwanekabahu IV, he is said to be the son of Sawulu Vijayabahu. During this time, a Muslim traveller and geographer named Ibn Battuta came to Sri Lanka and wrote a book about it. The Gadaladeniya Viharaya is the main building made in the Gampola Kingdom period. The Lankatilaka Viharaya is also a main building built in Gampola.

Kingdom of Kotte

After winning the battle, Parakramabahu VI sent an officer named Alagakkonar to check the new kingdom of Kotte.

Kingdom of Sitawaka

The kingdom of Sithawaka lasted for a short span of time during the Portuguese era.

Vannimai

Vannimai, also called Vanni Nadu, were feudal land divisions ruled by Vanniar chiefs south of the Jaffna peninsula in northern Sri Lanka. Pandara Vanniyan allied with the Kandy Nayakars led a rebellion against the British and Dutch colonial powers in Sri Lanka in 1802. He was able to liberate Mullaitivu and other parts of northern Vanni from Dutch rule. In 1803, Pandara Vanniyan was defeated by the British and Vanni came under British rule.

Crisis of the Sixteenth Century (1505–1594)

Portuguese intervention

The first Europeans to visit Sri Lanka in modern times were the Portuguese: Lourenço de Almeida arrived in 1505 and found that the island, divided into seven warring kingdoms, was unable to fend off intruders. The Portuguese founded a fort at the port city of Colombo in 1517 and gradually extended their control over the coastal areas. In 1592, the Sinhalese moved their capital to the inland city of Kandy, a location more secure against attack from invaders. Intermittent warfare continued through the 16th century.

Many lowland Sinhalese converted to Christianity due to missionary campaigns by the Portuguese while the coastal Moors were religiously persecuted and forced to retreat to the Central highlands. The Buddhist majority disliked the Portuguese occupation and its influences, welcoming any power who might rescue them. When the Dutch captain Joris van Spilbergen landed in 1602, the king of Kandy appealed to him for help.

Dutch intervention

Rajasinghe II, the king of Kandy, made a treaty with the Dutch in 1638 to get rid of the Portuguese who ruled most of the coastal areas of the island. The main conditions of the treaty were that the Dutch were to hand over the coastal areas they had captured to the Kandyan king in return for a Dutch trade monopoly over the island. The agreement was breached by both parties. The Dutch captured Colombo in 1656 and the last Portuguese strongholds near Jaffnapatnam in 1658. By 1660 they controlled the whole island except the land-locked kingdom of Kandy. The Dutch (Protestants) persecuted the Catholics and the remaining Portuguese settlers but left Buddhists, Hindus and Muslims alone. The Dutch levied far heavier taxes on the people than the Portuguese had done.

Kandyan period (1594–1815)

After the invasion of the Portuguese, Konappu Bandara (King Vimaladharmasuriya) intelligently won the battle and became the first king of the kingdom of Kandy. He built The Temple of the Sacred Tooth Relic. The monarch ended with the death of the last king, Sri Vikrama Rajasinha in 1832.

Colonial Sri Lanka (1815–1948)

During the Napoleonic Wars, Great Britain, fearing that French control of the Netherlands might deliver Sri Lanka to the French, occupied the coastal areas of the island (which they called Ceylon) with little difficulty in 1796. In 1802, the Treaty of Amiens formally ceded the Dutch part of the island to Britain and it became a crown colony. In 1803, the British invaded the Kingdom of Kandy in the first Kandyan War, but were repulsed. In 1815 Kandy was annexed in the second Kandyan War, finally ending Sri Lankan independence.

Following the suppression of the Uva Rebellion the Kandyan peasantry were stripped of their lands by the Crown Lands (Encroachments) Ordinance No. 12 of 1840 (sometimes called the Crown Lands Ordinance or the Waste Lands Ordinance), a modern enclosure movement, and reduced to penury. The British found that the uplands of Sri Lanka were very suitable for coffee, tea and rubber cultivation. By the mid-19th century, Ceylon tea had become a staple of the British market bringing great wealth to a small number of European tea planters. The planters imported large numbers of Tamil workers as indentured labourers from south India to work the estates, who soon made up 10% of the island's population.

The British colonial administration favoured the semi-European Burghers, certain high-caste Sinhalese and the Tamils who were mainly concentrated to the north of the country. Nevertheless, the British also introduced democratic elements to Sri Lanka for the first time in its history and the Burghers were given degree of self-government as early as 1833. It was not until 1909 that constitutional development began, with a partly elected assembly, and not until 1920 that elected members outnumbered official appointees. Universal suffrage was introduced in 1931 over the protests of the Sinhalese, Tamil and Burgher elite who objected to the common people being allowed to vote.

Independence movement

Ceylon National Congress (CNC) was founded to agitate for greater autonomy, although the party was soon split along ethnic and caste lines. Historian K. M. de Silva has stated that the refusal of the Ceylon Tamils to accept minority status is one of the main causes of the break up of the Ceylon National congress. The CNC did not seek independence (or "Swaraj"). What may be called the independence movement broke into two streams: the "constitutionalists", who sought independence by gradual modification of the status of Ceylon; and the more radical groups associated with the Colombo Youth League, Labour movement of Goonasinghe, and the Jaffna Youth Congress. These organizations were the first to raise the cry of "Swaraj" ("outright independence") following the Indian example when Jawaharlal Nehru, Sarojini Naidu and other Indian leaders visited Ceylon in 1926. The efforts of the constitutionalists led to the arrival of the Donoughmore Commission reforms in 1931 and the Soulbury Commission recommendations, which essentially upheld the 1944 draft constitution of the Board of ministers headed by D. S. Senanayake. The Marxist Lanka Sama Samaja Party (LSSP), which grew out of the Youth Leagues in 1935, made the demand for outright independence a cornerstone of their policy. Its deputies in the State Council, N.M. Perera and Philip Gunawardena, were aided in this struggle by other less radical members like Colvin R. De Silva, Leslie Goonewardene, Vivienne Goonewardene, Edmund Samarkody and Natesa Iyer. They also demanded the replacement of English as the official language by Sinhala and Tamil. The Marxist groups were a tiny minority and yet their movement was viewed with great interest by the British administration. The ineffective attempts to rouse the public against the British Raj in revolt would have led to certain bloodshed and a delay in independence. British state papers released in the 1950s show that the Marxist movement had a very negative impact on the policy makers at the Colonial office.

The Soulbury Commission was the most important result of the agitation for constitutional reform in the 1930s. The Tamil organization was by then led by G. G. Ponnambalam, who had rejected the "Ceylonese identity". Ponnamblam had declared himself a "proud Dravidian" and proclaimed an independent identity for the Tamils. He attacked the Sinhalese and criticized their historical chronicle known as the Mahavamsa. The first Sinhalese-Tamil riot came in 1939. Ponnambalam opposed universal franchise, supported the caste system, and claimed that the protection of minority rights requires that minorities (35% of the population in 1931) having an equal number of seats in parliament to that of the Sinhalese (65% of the population). This "50-50" or "balanced representation" policy became the hall mark of Tamil politics of the time. Ponnambalam also accused the British of having established colonization in "traditional Tamil areas", and having favoured the Buddhists by the Buddhist temporalities act. The Soulbury Commission rejected the submissions by Ponnambalam and even criticized what they described as their unacceptable communal character. Sinhalese writers pointed to the large immigration of Tamils to the southern urban centres, especially after the opening of the Jaffna-Colombo railway. Meanwhile, Senanayake, Baron Jayatilleke, Oliver Gunatilleke and others lobbied the Soulbury Commission without confronting them officially. The unofficial submissions contained what was to later become the draft constitution of 1944.

The close collaboration of the D. S. Senanayake government with the war-time British administration led to the support of Lord Louis Mountbatten. His dispatches and a telegram to the Colonial office supporting Independence for Ceylon have been cited by historians as having helped the Senanayake government to secure the independence of Sri Lanka. The shrewd cooperation with the British as well as diverting the needs of the war market to Ceylonese markets as a supply point, managed by Oliver Goonatilleke, also led to a very favourable fiscal situation for the newly independent government.

The Second World War

Sri Lanka was a front-line British base against the Japanese during World War II. Sri Lankan opposition to the war led by the Marxist organizations and the leaders of the LSSP pro-independence group were arrested by the Colonial authorities. On 5 April 1942, the Indian Ocean raid saw the Japanese Navy bomb Colombo. The Japanese attack led to the flight of Indian merchants, dominant in the Colombo commercial sector, which removed a major political problem facing the Senanayake government. Marxist leaders also escaped to India where they participated in the independence struggle there. The movement in Ceylon was minuscule, limited to the English-educated intelligentsia and trade unions, mainly in the urban centres. These groups were led by Robert Gunawardena, Philip's brother. In stark contrast to this "heroic" but ineffective approach to the war, the Senanayake government took advantage to further its rapport with the commanding elite. Ceylon became crucial to the British Empire in the war, with Lord Louis Mountbatten using Colombo as his headquarters for the Eastern Theatre. Oliver Goonatilleka successfully exploited the markets for the country's rubber and other agricultural products to replenish the treasury. Nonetheless, the Sinhalese continued to push for independence and the Sinhalese sovereignty, using the opportunities offered by the war, pushed to establish a special relationship with Britain.

Meanwhile, the Marxists, identifying the war as an imperialist sideshow and desiring a proletarian revolution, chose a path of agitation disproportionate to their negligible combat strength and diametrically opposed to the "constitutionalist" approach of Senanayake and other ethnic Sinhalese leaders. A small garrison on the Cocos Islands manned by Ceylonese mutinied against British rule. It has been claimed that the LSSP had some hand in the action, though this is far from clear. Three of the participants were the only British colony subjects to be shot for mutiny during World War II.
Two members of the Governing Party, Junius Richard Jayawardene and Dudley Senanayake, held discussions with the Japanese to collaborate in fighting the British. Sri Lankans in Singapore and Malaysia formed the 'Lanka Regiment' of the anti-British Indian National Army.

The constitutionalists led by D. S. Senanayake succeeded in winning independence. The Soulbury constitution was essentially what Senanayake's board of ministers had drafted in 1944. The promise of Dominion status and independence itself had been given by the Colonial Office.

Independence
The Sinhalese leader Don Stephen Senanayake left the CNC on the issue of independence, disagreeing with the revised aim of 'the achieving of freedom', although his real reasons were more subtle. He subsequently formed the United National Party (UNP) in 1946, when a new constitution was agreed on, based on the behind-the-curtain lobbying of the Soulbury commission. At the elections of 1947, the UNP won a minority of seats in parliament, but cobbled together a coalition with the Sinhala Maha Sabha party of Solomon Bandaranaike and the Tamil Congress of G.G. Ponnambalam. The successful inclusions of the Tamil-communalist leader Ponnambalam, and his Sinhalese counterpart Bandaranaike were a remarkable political balancing act by Senanayake. The vacuum in Tamil Nationalist politics, created by Ponnamblam's transition to a moderate, opened the field for the Tamil Arasu Kachchi ("Federal party"), a Tamil sovereignty party led by S. J. V. Chelvanaykam who was the lawyer son of a Christian minister.

Sri Lanka (1948–present)

Dominion

Dominion status followed on 4 February 1948 with military treaties with Britain, as the upper ranks of the armed forces were initially British, and British air and sea bases remaining intact. This was later raised to independence itself and Senanayake became the first Prime Minister of Sri Lanka. In 1949, with the concurrence of the leaders of the Ceylon Tamils, the UNP government disenfranchised the Indian Tamil plantation workers. This was the price that Senanayake had to pay to obtain the support of the Kandyan Sinhalese, who felt threatened by the demographics of the tea estates where the inclusion of the "Indian Tamils" would have meant electoral defeat for the Kandyan leaders. Senanayake died in 1952 after falling from a horse and was succeeded by his son Dudley Senanayake, the then minister of Agriculture. In 1953 he resigned following a massive Hartal ("general strike") by the Left parties against the UNP. He was followed by John Kotelawala, a senior politician and an uncle of Dudley Senanayake. Kotelawala did not have the enormous personal prestige or the adroit political acumen of D. S. Senanayake. He brought to the fore the issue of national languages that D. S. Senanayake had adroitly kept on the back burner, antagonising the Tamils and the Sinhalese by stating conflicting policies with regard to the status of Sinhala and Tamil as official languages. He also antagonized the Buddhist lobby by attacking politically active Buddhist Monks who were Bandaranaike's supporters.

In 1956, the Senate was abolished and Sinhala was established as the official language, with Tamil as a second language. Appeals to the Judicial Committee of the Privy Council in London were abolished and plantations were nationalised to fulfil the election pledges of the Marxist program and to "prevent the ongoing dis-investment by the owning companies".  In 1956, the Sinhala Only Act came into being. This established Sinhala as the first and preferred language in commerce and education. The Act took effect immediately. As a consequence vast numbers of people, mostly Burghers, left the country to live abroad as they felt discriminated against. In 1958, the first major riots between Sinhalese and Tamils flared up in Colombo as a direct result of the government's language policy.

1971 Uprising

The leftist Sinhalese Janatha Vimukthi Peramuna drew worldwide attention when it launched an insurrection against the Bandaranayake government in April 1971. Although the insurgents were young, poorly armed, and inadequately trained, they succeeded in seizing and holding major areas in Southern and Central provinces before they were defeated by the security forces. Their attempt to seize power created a major crisis for the government and forced a fundamental reassessment of the nation's security needs.

The movement was started in the late 1960s by Rohana Wijeweera, who became a Maoist and participated in the pro-Beijing branch of the Ceylon Communist Party, He was increasingly at odds with party leaders and impatient with its lack of revolutionary purpose. His success in working with youth groups and his popularity as a public speaker led him to organize his own movement in 1967. Initially identified simply as the New Left, this group drew on students and unemployed youths from rural areas, most of them in the sixteen-to-twenty-five-age-group. Many of these new recruits were members of minority so called 'lower' castes (Karava and Durava) who felt that their economic interests had been neglected by the nation's leftist coalitions. The standard program of indoctrination, the so-called Five Lectures, included discussions of Indian imperialism, the growing economic crisis, the failure of the island's communist and socialist parties, and the need for a sudden, violent seizure of power. Between 1967 and 1970, the group expanded rapidly, gaining control of the student socialist movement at a number of major university campuses and winning recruits and sympathizers within the armed forces. Some of these latter supporters actually provided sketches of police stations, airports, and military facilities that were important to the initial success of the revolt. In order to draw the newer members more tightly into the organization and to prepare them for a coming confrontation, Wijeweera opened "education camps" in several remote areas along the south and southwestern coasts. These camps provided training in Marxism–Leninism and in basic military skills.

While developing secret cells and regional commands, Wijeweera's group also began to take a more public role during the elections of 1970. His cadres campaigned openly for the United Front of Sirimavo R. D. Bandaranaike, but at the same time they distributed posters and pamphlets promising violent rebellion if Bandaranaike did not address the interests of the proletariat. In a manifesto issued during this period, the group used the name Janatha Vimukthi Peramuna for the first time. Because of the subversive tone of these publications, the United National Party government had Wijeweera detained during the elections, but the victorious Bandaranaike ordered his release in July 1970. In the politically tolerant atmosphere of the next few months, as the new government attempted to win over a wide variety of unorthodox leftist groups, the JVP intensified both the public campaign and the private preparations for a revolt. Although their group was relatively small, the members hoped to immobilize the government by selective kidnapping and sudden, simultaneous strikes against the security forces throughout the island. Some of the necessary weapons had been bought with funds supplied by the members. For the most part, however, they relied on raids against police stations and army camps to secure weapons, and they manufactured their own bombs.  Wijeweera was arrested and sent to Jaffna Prison, where he remained throughout the revolt. In response to his arrest and the growing pressure of police investigations, other JVP leaders decided to act immediately, and they agreed to begin the uprising at 11:00 P.M. on 5 April 1971. Rebel groups armed with shotguns, bombs, and Molotov cocktails launched simultaneous attacks against seventy- four police stations around the island and cut power to major urban areas. The attacks were most successful in the south. By 10 April, the rebels had taken control of Matara District and the city of Ambalangoda in Galle District and came close to capturing the remaining areas of Southern Province.

The new government was ill-prepared for the crisis that confronted it. Bandaranaike was caught off guard by the scale of the uprising and was forced to call on India to provide basic security functions. Indian frigates patrolled the coast and Indian troops guarded Bandaranaike International Airport at Katunayaka while Indian Air Force helicopters assisted the counteroffensive. Sri Lanka's all-volunteer army had no combat experience since World War II and no training in counterinsurgency warfare. Although the police were able to defend some areas unassisted, in many places the government deployed personnel from all three services in a ground force capacity. Royal Ceylon Air Force helicopters delivered relief supplies to beleaguered police stations while combined service patrols drove the insurgents out of urban areas and into the countryside. After two weeks of fighting, the government regained control of all but a few remote areas. In both human and political terms, the cost of the victory was high: an estimated 10,000 insurgents—many of them in their teens—died in the conflict, and the army was widely perceived to have used excessive force. In order to win over an alienated population and to prevent a prolonged conflict, Bandaranaike offered amnesties in May and June 1971, and only the top leaders were actually imprisoned. Wijeweera, who was already in detention at the time of the uprising, was given a twenty-year sentence and the JVP was proscribed.

Under the six years of emergency rule that followed the uprising, the JVP remained dormant. After the victory of the United National Party in the 1977 elections, however, the new government attempted to broaden its mandate with a period of political tolerance. Wijeweera was freed, the ban was lifted, and the JVP entered the arena of legal political competition. As a candidate in the 1982 presidential elections, Wijeweera finished fourth, with more than 250,000 votes (as compared with Jayewardene's 3.2 million). During this period, and especially as the Tamil conflict to the north became more intense, there was a marked shift in the ideology and goals of the JVP. Initially Marxist in orientation, and claiming to represent the oppressed of both the Tamil and Sinhalese communities, the group emerged increasingly as a Sinhalese nationalist organization opposing any compromise with the Tamil insurgency. This new orientation became explicit in the anti-Tamil riots of July 1983. Because of its role in inciting violence, the JVP was once again banned and its leadership went underground.

The group's activities intensified in the second half of 1987 in the wake of the Indo-Sri Lankan Accord. The prospect of Tamil autonomy in the north together with the presence of Indian troops stirred up a wave of Sinhalese nationalism and a sudden growth of antigovernment violence. During 1987 a new group emerged that was an offshoot of the JVP—the Patriotic Liberation Organization (Deshapremi Janatha Viyaparaya—DJV). The DJV claimed responsibility for the August 1987 assassination attempts against the president and prime minister. In addition, the group launched a campaign of intimidation against the ruling party, killing more than seventy members of Parliament between July and November.

Along with the group's renewed violence came a renewed fear of infiltration of the armed forces. Following the successful raid of the Pallekelle army camp in May 1987, the government conducted an investigation that resulted in the discharge of thirty-seven soldiers suspected of having links with the JVP. In order to prevent a repetition of the 1971 uprising, the government considered lifting the ban on the JVP in early 1988 and permitting the group to participate again in the political arena. With Wijeweera still underground, however, the JVP had no clear leadership at the time, and it was uncertain whether it had the cohesion to mount any coordinated offensive, either military or political, against the government.

Republic
The Democratic Socialist republic of Sri Lanka was established on 22 May 1972. By 1977, the voters were tired of Bandaranaike's socialist policies and elections returned the UNP to power under Junius Jayewardene, on a manifesto pledging a market economy and "a free ration of 8 seers (kilograms) of cereals". The SLFP and the left-wing parties were virtually wiped out in Parliament, although they garnered 40% of the popular vote, leaving the Tamil United Liberation Front led by Appapillai Amirthalingam as the official opposition. This created a dangerous ethnic division in Sri Lankan politics.

After coming to power, Jayewardene directed the rewriting of the constitution. The document that was produced, the new Constitution of 1978, drastically altered the nature of governance in Sri Lanka. It replaced the previous Westminster style, parliamentary government with a new presidential system modeled after France, with a powerful chief executive. The president was to be elected by direct suffrage for a six-year term and was empowered to appoint, with parliamentary approval, the prime minister and to preside over cabinet meetings. Jayewardene became the first president under the new Constitution and assumed direct control of the government machinery and party.

The new regime ushered in an era that did not augur well for the SLFP. Jayewardene's UNP government accused former prime minister Bandaranaike of abusing her power while in office from 1970 to 1977. In October 1980, Bandaranaike's privilege to engage in politics was removed for a period of seven years, and the SLFP was forced to seek a new leader. After a long and divisive battle, the party chose her son, Anura. Anura Bandaranaike was soon thrust into the role of the keeper of his father's legacy, but he inherited a political party torn apart by factionalism and reduced to a minimal role in the Parliament.

The 1978 Constitution included substantial concessions to Tamil sensitivities. Although TULF did not participate in framing the Constitution, it continued to sit in Parliament in the hope of negotiating a settlement to the Tamil problem. TULF also agreed to Jayewardene's proposal of an all-party conference to resolve the island's ethnic problems. Jayewardene's UNP offered other concessions in a bid to secure peace. Sinhala remained the official language and the language of administration throughout Sri Lanka, but Tamil was given a new "national language" status. Tamil was to be used in a number of administrative and educational circumstances. Jayewardene also eliminated a major Tamil grievance by abrogating the "standardization" policy of the United Front government, which had made university admission criteria for Tamils more difficult. In addition, he offered many top-level positions, including that of minister of justice, to Tamil civil servants.

While TULF, in conjunction with the UNP, pressed for the all-party conference, the Tamil Tigers escalated their terrorist attacks, which provoked Sinhalese backlash against Tamils and generally precluded any successful accommodation. In reaction to the assassination of a Jaffna police inspector, the Jayewardene government declared an emergency and dispatched troops, who were given an unrealistic six months to eradicate the terrorist threat.

The government passed the Prevention of Terrorism (Temporary Provisions) Act in 1979. The act was enacted as a temporary measure, but it later became permanent legislation. The International Commission of Jurists, Amnesty International, and other human rights organizations condemned the act as being incompatible with democratic traditions. Despite the act, the number of terrorist acts increased. Guerrillas began to hit targets of high symbolic value such as post offices and police outposts, provoking government counterattacks. As an increasing number of civilians were caught in the fighting, Tamil support widened for the "boys", as the guerrillas began to be called. Other large, well-armed groups began to compete with LTTE. The better-known included the People's Liberation Organization of Tamil Eelam, Tamil Eelam Liberation Army, and the Tamil Eelam Liberation Organization. Each of these groups had forces measured in the hundreds if not thousands. The government claimed that many of the terrorists were operating from training camps in India's Tamil Nadu State. The Indian government repeatedly denied this claim. With the level of violence mounting, the possibility of negotiation became increasingly distant.

Internal conflict

In July 1983, communal riots took place due to the ambush and killing of 13 Sri Lankan Army soldiers by the Tamil Tigers using the voters list, which contained the exact addresses of Tamils. The Tamil community faced a backlash from Sinhalese rioters including the destruction of shops, homes, savage beatings and the burning of Jaffna library. A few Sinhalese kept Tamil neighbours in their homes to protect them from the rioters. During these riots the government did nothing to control the mob. Conservative government estimates put the death toll at 400, while the real death toll is believed to be around 3000. Also around 18,000 Tamil homes and another 5,000 homes were destroyed, with 150,000 leaving the country resulting in a Tamil diaspora in Canada, the UK, Australia and other western countries.

In elections held on 17 November 2005 Mahinda Rajapakse was elected president after defeating Ranil Wickremasinghe by a mere 180,000 votes. He appointed Wickremanayake as Prime Minister and Mangala Samaraweera as Foreign Minister. Negotiations with the LTTE stalled and a low-intensity conflict began. The violence dropped off after talks in February but escalated again in April and the conflict continued until the military defeat of the LTTE in May 2009.

The Sri Lanka government declared total victory on 18 May 2009. On 19 May 2009, the Sri Lankan military led by General Sarath Fonseka, effectively concluded its 26-year operation against the LTTE, its military forces recaptured all remaining LTTE controlled territories in the Northern Province including Killinochchi (2 January), the Elephant Pass (9 January) and ultimately the entire district of Mullaitivu.

On 22 May 2009, Sri Lankan Defence Secretary Gotabhaya Rajapaksa confirmed that 6,261 personnel of the Sri Lankan Armed Forces had died and 29,551 were wounded during the Eelam War IV since July 2006. Brigadier Udaya Nanayakkara added that approximately 22,000 LTTE fighters had died during this time. The war caused the death of 80 000-100 000 civilians. There are allegations that war crimes were committed by the Sri Lankan military and the rebel Liberation Tigers of Tamil Eelam (Tamil Tigers) during the Sri Lankan Civil War, particularly during the final months of the Eelam War IV phase in 2009. The alleged war crimes include attacks on civilians and civilian buildings by both sides; executions of combatants and prisoners by both sides; enforced disappearances by the Sri Lankan military and paramilitary groups backed by them; acute shortages of food, medicine, and clean water for civilians trapped in the war zone; and child recruitment by the Tamil Tigers.

Several International bodies including UNROW Human Rights Impact Litigation Clinic, Human Rights Watch and Permanent People's Tribunal have raised allegations on the Sri Lankan Government for genocide against Tamils. On 10 December 2013, Permanent People's Tribunal unanimously ruled Sri Lanka guilty of the crime of genocide against the Tamil people.

Post-conflict period
Presidential elections were completed in January 2010. Mahinda Rajapaksa won the elections with 59% of the votes, defeating General Sarath Fonseka who was the united opposition candidate. Fonseka was subsequently arrested and convicted by court martial.

In January 2015 presidential elections Mahinda Rajapaksa was defeated by the common candidate of opposition, Maithripala Sirisena, and Rajapaksa's attempted return was thwarted in the parliamentary election the same year by Ranil Wickremesinghe This resulted in a unity government between the UNP and SLFP

Easter Sunday Attacks
 
On 21 April 2019, Easter Sunday, three churches in Sri Lanka and three luxury hotels in the commercial capital, Colombo, were targeted in a series of coordinated Islamic terrorist suicide bombings. A total of 267 people were killed, including at least 45 foreign nationals, three police officers, and eight bombers, and at least 500 were injured. All eight of the suicide bombers in the attacks were Sri Lankan citizens associated with National Thowheeth Jama'ath, a local militant Islamist group with suspected foreign ties, previously known for attacks against Buddhists and Sufis.

Rajapaksa brothers in power 

Sri Lankan President, Maithripala Sirisena, decided not to seek re-election in 2019. In November 2019 presidential election former wartime defence chief Gotabaya Rajapaksa was elected as the new President of Sri Lanka. He was the candidate for the SLPP, the Sinhalese-Buddhist nationalist party, and brother of former president Mahinda Rajapaksa. 
In August 2020 parliamentary elections the party, led by the Rajapaksa brothers, got a landslide victory. Mahinda Rajapaksa, former Sri Lankan president and brother of current president, became the new Prime Minister of Sri Lanka.

Since 2010, Sri Lanka has witnessed a sharp rise in foreign debt The onset of the COVID-19 pandemic-induced global recession accelerated the crisis and by 2021, the foreign debt rose to 101% of the nation's GDP, causing an economic crisis. In March 2022, spontaneous and organized protests by both political parties and non-partisan groups over the government's mishandling of the economy were reported from several areas. On 31 March, a large group gathered around the residence of Gotabaya Rajapaksa to protest against the power cuts that had reached over 12-hours a day. The protest was initially spontaneous peaceful protest by citizens until the police attacked the protestors with tear gas and water cannons and the protestors burned down a bus carrying riot control troops. The government declared a curfew in Colombo.

On 9 July 2022 after many months of protests, the President's residence was stormed by protesters. The President escaped and then fled the country on a military jet to the Maldives. His departure followed months of mass protests over soaring prices and a lack of food and fuel. The country's foreign currency reserves have dipped low and the country has missed debt interest payments. President Gotabaya Rajapaksa appointed Prime Minister Ranil Wickremesinghe as acting president, who declared a state of emergency in western providences. Thousands of Sri Lankan protesters streamed the streets of the capital, Colombo.

In July 2022, protesters occupied President's House in Colombo, causing Rajapaksa to flee and Prime Minister Ranil Wickremesinghe to announce his own willingness to resign.

See also

 History of Asia
 Outline of South Asian history
 Mahavamsa
 Architecture of ancient Sri Lanka
 Ancient constructions of Sri Lanka
 Irrigation works in ancient Sri Lanka
 Politics of Sri Lanka
 List of presidents of Sri Lanka
 List of prime ministers of Sri Lanka
 Velupillai Prabakaran

References

Further reading
 Arsecularatne, S. N, Sinhalese immigrants in Malaysia & Singapore, 1860–1990: History through recollections, (Colombo, KVG de Silva & Sons, 1991)
 Bandarage, Asoka. The separatist conflict in Sri Lanka: Terrorism, ethnicity, political economy (Routledge, 2008).
 
 Brohier, R. L, The Golden Age of Military Adventure in Ceylon: an account of the Uva Rebellion 1817–1818. (Colombo: 1933)
 Cheran, Rudhramoorthy, ed. Pathways of dissent: Tamil nationalism in Sri Lanka;; (Sage Publications India, 2009).

 Crusz, Noel, The Cocos Islands Mutiny. (Fremantle Arts Centre Press, Fremantle, WA, 2001)
 De Mel, Neloufer. Women & the nation's narrative: gender and nationalism in twentieth century Sri Lanka. (Rowman & Littlefield, 2001).
 Deraniyagala, Siran, The Prehistory of Sri Lanka; an ecological perspective. (revised ed.), (Colombo: Archaeological Survey Department of Sri Lanka, 1992)
 de Silva Wijeyeratne, Roshan. Nation, Constitutionalism and Buddhism in Sri Lanka. ( Routledge, 2013).
 DeVotta, Neil. "From ethnic outbidding to ethnic conflict: the institutional bases for Sri Lanka's separatist war 1." Nations and Nationalism 11.1 (2005): 141-159.

 Ganguly, Sumit. "Ending the Sri Lankan civil war." Dædalus 147.1 (2018): 78–89. online
 Liyanagamage, Amaradasa, The decline of Polonnaruwa and the rise of Dambadeniya. (Department of Cultural Affairs, Government Press, Colombo, Sri Lanka. 1968)
 Manogaran, Chelvadurai. Ethnic conflict and reconciliation in Sri Lanka (University of Hawaii Press, 1987).

 
 
 Pieris, Paulus Edward, Ceylon and Hollanders 1658–1796. (American Ceylon Mission Press, 1918).
 Pieris, Paulus Edward, Ceylon and the Portuguese 1505–1658. (American Ceylon Mission Press, 1920}.
 Peiris, Gerald Hubert. Twilight of the tigers: peace efforts and power struggles in Sri Lanka. (Oxford University Press, 2009).

 Silva, K. M. de History of Sri Lanka (1982) pp 239–488 online 
 Silva, R. Kumar de, and Willemina G. M. Beumer, Illustrations and Views of Dutch Ceylon, 1602–1796. Serendib Publications, London, 1988.
 Sivasundaram, Sujit. "Ethnicity, Indigeneity, and Migration in the Advent of British Rule to Sri Lanka," American Historical Review (2010) 115#2 pp 428–452.
 

 Tambiah, Stanley Jeyaraja. Buddhism betrayed?: Religion, politics, and violence in Sri Lanka (University of Chicago Press, 1992).
 Vittachi, Tarzie. Emergency'58: the story of the Ceylon race riots (London: Andre Deutsch, 1958).

 Wickramasinghe, Nira. Sri Lanka in the Modern Age: A History (2015)
 Woodcock, George. "The Kings of Kandy" History Today'' (Dec 1963) 13#12 pp 852–862, covers 1505 to 1833.  
The Betrayal of Buddhism: An Abridged Version of the Report of the Buddhist Committee of Inquiry 1956:124 pages

External links
 Nearly 1200 links on Sri Lanka
 The Virtual Motherland of Sri Lankans
 Sri Lanka in 1942 – World War II Movie Clip
 Library of Congress Country Study: Sri Lanka
 The Netherlands – Ceylon Heritage
 Colombo in Dutch Times
 Jacob Haafner. Travels Through The Island of Ceylon in 1783
 The Dutch in Ceylon glimpse of their life and times
 The Journal of the Dutch Burgher Union of Ceylon
 A Baptism of Fire: The Van Goens Mission to Ceylon and India, 1653–54
 1694 Census in Jaffnapatnam City and Castle
 Dutch and Portuguese Buildings in Sri Lanka
 Tourist Board of Sri Lanka
 hWeb – Sri Lanka's recent history of ethnic conflict originates from its colonial legacy
 Books on Sri Lanka History
 Maritime Heritage in Sri Lanka
 The Mahavamsa History of Sri Lanka The Great Chronicle of Sri Lanka
 Peace and Conflict Timeline (PACT) – interactive timeline of the Sri Lankan conflict
 1956 – A Year of National and Religious Awakening
 Repression of Buddhism in Sri Lanka by the Portuguese (1505–1658)